Halo Khan Ardalan was one of the most famous Ardalan rulers in the sixteenth and seventeenth century. He ruled the autonomous Ardalan state from 1590 to 1616. He is known as the most powerful Ardalan ruler. He ruled over a large part of Kurdistan and his state was majorly independent from Safavid and Ottoman empire.

References

Kurdish rulers
Ardalan
16th-century Kurdish people
17th-century Kurdish people
16th-century people of Safavid Iran
17th-century people of Safavid Iran